Teniz is a bittern salt lake in Yereymentau District, Akmola Region, Kazakhstan.

Teniz is part of an Important Bird Area and the Buiratau National Park, a protected area, lies to the south of the lake.

Geography
The lake has two prominent headlands, one in the northern shore and the other in the southern, dividing the lake into wide bays and a peninsula. 

There are also other lakes nearby, all of them smaller, such as Kurbetkol close to the southeastern end.

See also
List of lakes of Kazakhstan

References

External links

Visitors banned from stunning naturally pink lake over tourist activity

Lakes of Kazakhstan
Endorheic lakes of Asia
Akmola Region